Pernambut is a town and village headquarters also a Municipality in Vellore district in the Indian state of Tamil Nadu. The economy is dependent on leather tanning industry, earning it the nickname Leather Tanning city of Tamil Nadu.Pernambut is a municipality and headquarters of Pernambut taluk which is an administrative division comprising 52 Revenue villages in the district of Vellore.

Tourism
Pernambut is multi cultured town, here you can see people of all religion, the most important religious places are 
Muslim Worship places in Pernambut consists:
Chowk Masjid, Jamiya Masdjid,Nawab Daryakhan Masjid - Founded in 1814,Park Masjid,Road Masjid e Ahle Hadees- Founded in 1899.new Masjid e Ahle Hadees- Founded in 1935.Small Masjide Ahle Hadees- Founded in 1816.Masjid-E-Istiqamath Ahle HadeesForquan Masid Ahle Hadees,Masjid-E-Hassaniya Ahle Hadees
Ahle Hadees Jamiya Masjid,Masjid-E-Shekul hadees-Ahle Hadees and many more
Hindu Worship places in pernambut include koils Gangai Amman Koil, Sivan Koil, Aanchaneyar Koil, Krishar koil, Vinayagar Koil, Venkatesa Perumal With Sri Devi and Bodevi Koil.
Christian Worship places in pernambut include St. Pauls Lutheran church - IELC, Church of God - COG

Demographics

According to 2011 census, Pernampattu had a population of 51,271 with a sex-ratio of 1,028 females for every 1,000 males, much above the national average of 929. A total of 6,866 were under the age of six, constituting 3,452 males and 3,414 females. Scheduled Castes and Scheduled Tribes accounted for 23.57% and .02% of the population respectively. The average literacy of the town was 68.94%, compared to the national average of 72.99%. The town had a total of 10,450 households. There were a total of 16,523 workers, comprising 62 cultivators, 103 main agricultural labourers, 1,602 in house hold industries, 12,838 other workers, 1,918 marginal workers, 30 marginal cultivators, 18 marginal agricultural labourers, 158 marginal workers in household industries and 1,712 other marginal workers. Pernambut is a multi cultural city, with people of all religions. According to the Census of 2011, Pernampattu (M) had  61.56% Muslims, 36.44% Hindus, 1.72% Christians, 0.02% Sikhs, 0.0% Buddhists, 0.1% Jains, 0.15% following other religions and 0.0% following no religion or did not indicate any religious preference.

Climate

Another source with different averages.

Economy and culture
The economy is dependent on the leather industries, glue factories as well as beedi factories where more of the locals work. The town houses leather tanning and manufacturing facilities and is a leading cluster for export of finished leather and leather-related products. Pernambut is known for its Unani Medicine. Ramadan and Eid Al-Adha festivals are celebrated by Muslims, Diwali and Pongal by Hindus and Christians celebrate Easter and Christmas.Paddy, Banans, coconuts, groundnuts, corn, soya, vegetables are cultivated here.

Transport
The Town is having a good transport facilities for all directions and major National Highways passing through Pernambut is NH75 which connects Mangalore, Bangalore and Vellore. State Highways major district roads and village roads. These roads are having access to surrounding important towns like Ambur, Vaniyambadi, Gudiyatham, Pallikonda and Vellore. It also connects metro cities of Chennai and Bangalore. The nearest international airports are Chennai International Airport (190 km) and Bengaluru International Airport (180 km);.
Pernambut is well-connected by road. National Highway 75 (NH 75) connects Pernambut to the nearest big city of Vellore. Pernambut is connected by road to all the major towns State Highways major district roads and village roads.

Distance between major towns and Pernambut:

 Chennai: 190 km
 Bangalore: 180 km
 Hosur: 142 km
 Vellore: 45 km
 V.Kota: 36 km
 Gudiyatham: 18 km
 Pallikonda: 28 km
Oomerabad: 10 km
 Ambur: 19 km
 Delhi: 2259 km
 Jammu: 2831 km
 Agra: 2028 km
 Jaipur: 2219 km
 Kolkata: 1755 km
 Mumbai: 1167 km
 Kanya Kumari: 660;km
 Ooty: 412;km
 Munnar: 472;km
 Mysore: 351;km

Politics
Pernambut assembly constituency (SC) was part of Vellore (Lok Sabha constituency) now it is part of Gudiyatham Assembly Constituency

Education

Schools
 ADW Higher Secondary School
 Govt. Girls Higher Secondary School
 Islamiah Higher Secondary School (Boys)
 Nusrath Girls Higher Secondary School (Girls)
 Concordia High School (Co-Edu)
 Govt. High School- Newline (Co-Edu)
 St. Josephs
 St. Pauls
 Vedha Nursery & Primary School

Colleges
 Nayagi Institute of Nursing (GNM - Co-ed)
 Madrasa-e-Dawat-Ul-Qur'an(Arabic College)
 Madrasa-e-Wasiyat-Ul-Uloom (Arabic College)
 merit haji Ismail sahib Arts and science (boys)

References

External links
 

Cities and towns in Vellore district